Acacia lanei, commonly known as Hyden wattle, is a shrub of the genus Acacia and the subgenus Plurinerves that is endemic to south western Australia.

Description
Like most species of Acacia it has phyllodes rather than true leaves. It blooms from July to September and produces yellow flowers.

Distribution
It is native to an area in the Wheatbelt region of Western Australia where it is usually situated along creeks and drainage lines growing in gravelly loam, clay and clay-loamy soils. It has a limited distribution to a small area around the town of Hyden where it is often a part of Eucalypt woodland communities and is often associated with Eucalyptus loxophleba or Eucalyptus salmonophloia''. It has also been grown as a windbreak and is found to be unpalatable to livestock.

See also
List of Acacia species

References

lanei
Acacias of Western Australia
Taxa named by Bruce Maslin
Plants described in 1990